Southampton Football Club is an English professional association football club based in Southampton, Hampshire. Founded in 1885 as St Mary's Y.M.A. and later known as Southampton St Mary's, they became a professional club in 1891, and co-founded the Southern League in 1894. Southampton won the Southern League championship six times between 1896 and 1904, and were later elected to the Football League in 1920 as co-founders of the Third Division. The Saints finished as runners-up in their first season, and the following year received promotion to the Second Division as Third Division South champions. The club first entered the First Division in 1966, and currently play in its modern-day counterpart, the Premier League. Southampton won the FA Cup in 1976, reached the final of the League Cup in 1979 and 2017, and won the League Trophy in 2010.

Southampton's first team have competed in a number of regionally and nationally contested leagues. Their record against each club faced in these competitions is listed below. The club's first league match was against Chatham Town, their first Football League match was against Gillingham, and they met their 117th and most recent different league opponent, Wigan Athletic, for the first time in the 2012–13 season. The team that Southampton have met most often in league competition is Tottenham Hotspur, who they first played in the 1896–97 Southern League season; the 66 defeats from 154 meetings is more than they have lost against any other club. Coventry City tie with Tottenham Hotspur for most league draws against Southampton, with 39 in 122 meetings. The club have recorded more league victories against Queens Park Rangers than against any other club, having beaten them 53 out of 120 attempts.

Table key
The table below includes results of matches played by Southampton (including under the former names of St. Mary's Y.M.A. and Southampton St. Mary's) in the Southern League, the United League, the Southern District Combination, the Western League, the Football League and the Premier League. Matches from the abandoned 1939–40 season are excluded, as are those played during the various wartime competitions.
The name used for each opponent is that which they had when Southampton most recently played a league match against them. Results against each opponent include results against that club under any former name. For example, results against Millwall include matches played against Millwall Athletic (until 1920).
The columns headed "First" and "Last" contain the first and most recent seasons in which Southampton played league matches against each opponent.
  Clubs with this background and symbol in the "Opponent" column are Southampton's divisional rivals in the current season.
  Clubs with this background and symbol in the "Opponent" column are defunct.

League record
Results current as of 18 March 2023

Footnotes

References

General

Specific

External links
Southampton F.C. official website

League record by opponent
Southampton